Greenwich and Lewisham is a constituency represented in the London Assembly.

It consists of the combined area of the Royal Borough of Greenwich and the London Borough of Lewisham.

Overlapping constituencies
In elections to Westminster it is traditionally a strong Labour-voting area, with all constituencies returning Labour MPs. Greenwich and Lewisham contains all of the following UK Parliament constituencies:

Eltham (Labour)
Greenwich and Woolwich (Labour)
Lewisham Deptford (Labour)
Lewisham East (Labour)

Additionally, it contains part of the following two constituencies:

Erith and Thamesmead (Labour)
Lewisham West and Penge (Labour)

Assembly Members

Mayoral election results 
Below are the results for the candidate which received the highest share of the popular vote in the constituency at each mayoral election.

Assembly election results

References

London Assembly constituencies
Politics of the Royal Borough of Greenwich
Politics of the London Borough of Lewisham
2000 establishments in England
Constituencies established in 2000